The Newark Light Rail (NLR) is a light rail system serving Newark, New Jersey and surrounding areas, operated by New Jersey Transit Bus Operations. The service consists of two segments, the original Newark City Subway (NCS), and the extension to Broad Street station. The City Subway opened on May 16, 1935, while the combined Newark Light Rail service was officially inaugurated on July 17, 2006.

Newark City Subway

The Newark City Subway is the longer and older of the two segments. The line is a "subway–surface" line which runs underground from Penn Station to Warren Street, and above-ground north of Warren Street. Before becoming a part of the Newark Light Rail service, it was also known as the #7-City Subway line, an NJT Bus Operations route number carried over from its days when it was part of Public Service's Transport of New Jersey subsidiary. The number still applies internally. (During subway system closures, replacement buses would also bear the route number "7 City Subway.")

History 

The line opened in 1935 along the old Morris Canal right-of-way, from Broad Street (now known as Military Park) to Heller Parkway (now replaced by the nearby Branch Brook Park station). Works Progress Administration artists decorated the underground stations with Art Deco scenes from life on the defunct Morris Canal. The southernmost part, south of Warren Street, was capped with a new road, known as Raymond Boulevard. Only one grade crossing was present on the original subway; the line crosses Orange Street at grade so it can pass over the below-grade Delaware, Lackawanna and Western Railroad (now NJT Morristown Line) immediately to the north. The original Newark City Subway line had its own right-of-way and did not share city streets with local traffic, except at the Orange Street grade crossing.

Operation of the complete subway to the newly built Penn Station was delayed until 1937. The terminal below Penn Station has five tracks, two incoming and three outgoing, connected by two loop tracks. This part of the subway included a grade-separated junction with a connection to the lower level of the Newark Public Service Terminal that was used for only a few months (June to September).

An extension to a wooden station at North 6th Street or Franklin Avenue was opened in 1940, located north of the present Branch Brook Park station. In 1953 the line was cut back about one block to accommodate construction of a turning loop, and a new station, still called Franklin Avenue, was opened adjacent to Anthony Street. The station was enlarged in 2002 and renamed Branch Brook Park.

The subway was operated by Transport of New Jersey (formerly Public Service Coordinated Transport) as its No. 7 line. Other streetcar routes used parts of the subway, reaching street trackage at the locations shown below, ending as each route was closed and replaced by bus service:
Public Service Terminal connection (and Cedar Street Subway), 1937 only: #13 Broad, #17 Paterson, #27 Mount Prospect, #43 Jersey City
Warren Street ramp, 1935–1951: #21 Orange—West Orange via Market Street
Central Avenue ramp, 1935–1947: #23 Central
Orange Street crossing, 1935–1952: #21 Orange—West Orange via Orange Street
Bloomfield Avenue ramp, 1935–1952: #29 Bloomfield

Until June 5, 1952, the Roseville Car House, on the south side of Main Street (on the No. 21 line) near the eastern city line of East Orange, was used for the No. 7 line. From that time until 2002, Newark Penn Station was used for storage and maintenance. A new shops and yard complex opened at the end of the extension to Grove Street.

Starting in January 1954, 30 PCC streetcars bought from Twin City Rapid Transit provided all service on the route. They were single-ended, requiring construction of a new turning loop at the Franklin Avenue terminal. The cars had been built 1946–1949 by the St. Louis Car Company and were sold by TCRT when that system went through a conversion to buses. Four cars were scrapped over the years, and two were sold to Shaker Heights Rapid Transit in 1978.

New Jersey Transit took over operations in 1980.

In 2001, new light rail cars built by Kinki Sharyo in Japan in 1999 replaced the PCCs. The last day of PCC service was August 24, 2001.

Some of the PCCs are stored in the Newark City Subway shop. Eleven were sold in 2004 to the San Francisco Municipal Railway for use on its F Market heritage streetcar line. One PCC, #15, was delivered to the Connecticut Trolley Museum in 2013 for restoration and display. One of the Shaker Heights cars has been restored by the Minnesota Transportation Museum, which operates it on a short stretch of track in western Minneapolis.

In 2005, eight PCCs were given to the City of Bayonne to be rehabilitated and operated along a proposed  loop to serve the Peninsula at Bayonne Harbor, formerly Military Ocean Terminal at Bayonne (MOTBY). The proposed line would be connected to the 34th Street station of the Hudson-Bergen Light Rail.

On September 4, 2004, Broad Street Station was renamed Military Park Station, to avoid confusion with the terminal of the new route to the Newark Broad Street Station at University Avenue, operated by New Jersey Transit.

Bloomfield extension

On June 22, 2002, the Newark City Subway was extended to the suburbs of Belleville and Bloomfield along what had been the former Erie Railroad Orange Branch, now under Norfolk Southern ownership. New stations were opened at Silver Lake and Grove Street, and the Heller Parkway and Franklin Avenue stations were combined into a new Branch Brook Park station. The loop at Franklin Avenue was removed, since the new vehicles are bidirectional, unlike the old PCCs. A new loop, however, is in place at the Grove Street facility. All the street crossings on the extension are at-grade.

Shared-track operation
The original agreement gave sole operating privileges to Norfolk Southern between 11 pm and 5 am daily, but a new agreement allows passenger service to operate at all hours, with late-night service commencing on January 8, 2005. In exchange, Norfolk Southern can now operate during all off-peak hours, when passenger trains are infrequent.

Broad Street Extension

The Broad Street Extension is the second segment of the Newark Light Rail. It was planned as the first phase of the Newark-Elizabeth Rail Link. It branches off the older City Subway using the existing junction that had led to the Public Service terminal.

A new tunnel leads from the junction to a portal about two blocks north. The remaining section runs above ground. For a few blocks, the two tracks run on different streets a block or two apart. Both tracks serve the New Jersey Performing Arts Center at Center Street. The outbound track makes stops at Atlantic Street and at the Bears and Eagles Riverfront Stadium. The inbound track makes a stop at Washington Park. The extension opened on July 17, 2006.

Construction began in 2002 with an estimated cost of $207.7 million, or about $40,000 per foot of track; it was completed within budget. Projections were for 4,000 average weekday boardings after one year, growing to about 7,000 in 2010. Actual weekday boardings in 2010 for both Newark Light Rail lines combined were reported at 9,000.

The art work at the new stations has a common theme, "Riding with Sarah and Wayne." It is intended as a tribute to Newark-born jazz greats Sarah Vaughan and Wayne Shorter, and includes the lyrics to Vaughan's signature song, "Send in the Clowns," and colored bricks representing the music notes.

The Broad Street Extension was intended to ease connections between Newark's two rail stations. The two separate stations are a legacy of their roots in two separate railroads. Broad Street Station was once owned by the Lackawanna Railroad and its successor, the Erie Lackawanna Railway, while Penn Station was built and owned by the Pennsylvania Railroad. Previously, passengers wanting to transfer between Amtrak and the former PRR/Conrail commuter lines and the former (Erie) Lackawanna commuter lines had to make their own way (usually by taxi or bus) between the two stations.

Fares 
The Newark Light Rail is equivalent to a one-zone bus ride: a one-way ticket costs $1.60 (as of October 1, 2015), and is valid for one hour on the entire system from the time the ticket is validated. A special $0.75 "Underground" fare is available for trips that use the subway only between Warren Street and Penn Station and not the surface portion. Through-ticketing is available for connecting bus routes. Monthly and weekly NJ Transit bus and rail passes valid for one or more local bus zones, as well as transfers purchased on buses, are also accepted.

The Newark Light Rail, like most light rail systems in the United States, operates on a proof-of-payment system, in which riders must present their tickets upon request during random fare inspections by police officers, transit workers, or fare agents. Passengers must purchase tickets at ticket vending machines (TVMs) located on station platforms or near station entrances. The tickets can also be purchased via the New Jersey Transit mobile app. One-way, round-trip, and ten-trip tickets must then be validated, either by the app or with paper tickets, through automated validators located near the TVMs, which stamp the date and time on the ticket for 60 minutes of use. NJ Transit's fare inspectors randomly check tickets on trains and at stations; fare evasion carries a fine of up to $100. On the PCC streetcars, cash fares (exact fare) were paid on board via farebox, except for a brief period starting in October 1999 prior to the introduction of LRVs, when proof-of-payment fare collection was instituted.

Stations

Newark City Subway

Broad Street Extension 

On weekdays, service operates separately between the two sections. On weekends, service operates jointly.

Rolling stock 

The Newark Light Rail system uses a new-model vehicle built by Kinki Sharyo of Japan. This model is the same one used by the Hudson-Bergen Light Rail system, although the ones used on the Newark Light Rail were built with slight modifications to the trucks and wheels due to the different rails used. Like the HBLR vehicles, the NLR vehicle is a double-articulated vehicle with three sections. Each of the two end sections has an operator's cab at the far end, thus eliminating the need for the vehicle to turn itself around physically in order to reverse direction. Each end section also has seating for 16 passengers on an upper level, and seating for 13 passengers on the lower level, including one special fold-down seat next to an empty space that a passenger using a wheelchair may use. With these two sections, and a middle section that seats ten passengers (five on each side), the vehicle can comfortably accommodate 68 seated passengers and two wheelchairs. An additional 122 passengers could stand in the vehicle, if necessary. Vehicles can be coupled into two-unit sets. A contract to expand 10 of the 20 LRVs assigned to the Newark Light Rail system for the purpose of increasing passenger capacity was approved on July 9, 2014.

The Seashore Trolley Museum in Kennebunkport, ME acquired PCC #5 in 2011. The car represents the first piece of NJT rolling stock in the museum's collection. The car is currently undergoing restoration and rehabilitation work so that it may operate on the museum's 1 1/2 mile demonstration railway. Car #5 joins the museum's already-extensive collection of PCC cars from numerous cities, including Boston, Pittsburgh, Dallas, San Francisco, Philadelphia, Washington, D.C., and Kansas CIty.

Timeline
December 22, 1910: The Public Service Corporation first announces plans to build the subway, initially including a line under Broad Street from Bridge Street to Clinton Avenue
October 3, 1934: The subway opens from Broad Street to Heller Parkway. The No. 21 line is routed onto the subway via the Warren Street Ramp and level junction at the Orange Street grade crossing. The No. 23 line is routed via the Norfolk Street Ramp. The No. 29 line starts using the Bloomfield Avenue Ramp.
June 20, 1937: The extension to Newark Penn Station opens. This is the same day that the Hudson and Manhattan Railroad (present-day PATH) withdraws service from its Park Place terminal and first operates into its new alignment at Newark Penn Station. The No. 13, #27 and No. 43 lines are rerouted to Penn Station via the Cedar Street Subway; the No. 27 and No. 43 had used the lower level of the Newark Public Service Terminal. 
June 21, 1937: The No. 17 line is rerouted via the Cedar Street Subway.
July 18, 1937: The No. 13 and No. 17 lines stop using the Cedar Street Subway.
December 29, 1937: The No. 27 line stops using the Cedar Street Subway.
May 1, 1938: The No. 43 line stops using the Cedar Street Subway, ending all service on that connection.
November 22, 1940: The extension to North 6th Street (later Franklin Avenue) opens.
December 14, 1947: The No. 23 line stops using the Norfolk Street Ramp.
March 1, 1951: The No. 21 line stops using the Warren Street Ramp.
March 29, 1952: The No. 21 line stops using the level junction at the Orange Street grade crossing.
March 30, 1952: The No. 29 line stops using the Bloomfield Avenue ramps.
January 8, 1954: The first PCC car uses the subway.
October 1980: NJ Transit takes over operations.
August 21, 1999: The subway is closed for two weeks for an overhaul.
September 7, 1999: The subway reopens.
August 24, 2001: The PCC cars are retired from service.
August 27, 2001: The new light rail vehicles begin operation.
June 21, 2002: Heller Parkway closes.
June 22, 2002: Silver Lake and Grove Street open.
September 4, 2004: Broad Street is renamed Military Park.
January 8, 2005: Additional late-night service is provided to Grove Street.
July 17, 2006: The Newark City Subway extension opens, with service between Newark Penn Station and Newark Broad Street. Service is rebranded as the Newark Light Rail.

Accidents
The Newark City Subway has had a few accidents over the years:
September 22, 1981 – Nine passengers injured when an incoming trolley rammed into the rear of a stationary trolley at Newark Penn Station.
April 15, 2003 – A light rail vehicle was partially derailed at the grade crossing near Orange Street Station when a box truck rammed the vehicle from the side. The signal was in the light rail vehicle's favor.
August 23, 2008 – A dump truck making an illegal right turn crashed into a light rail vehicle at the Washington Park Station of the Broad Street segment causing it to partially derail. One passenger was injured.
August 28, 2014 – A light rail vehicle crashed into a SUV between Atlantic Avenue and Broad Street. No passengers were injured.
April 6, 2016 – A light rail vehicle was hit by a car on South Franklin Avenue. No passengers were injured.

In popular culture
In November 2011 scenes for the movie The Dark Knight Rises were filmed at Military Park station.

See also
 Hudson–Bergen Light Rail
 River Line
 Light rail in the United States
 List of tram and light rail transit systems

References

Bibliography
Edward Hamm, Jr., The Public Service Trolley Lines in New Jersey.
DOT Docket FRA-2000-7335-7 and −8.

External links

 NJ Transit – Light Rail Schedules
 Newark Light Rail & Proposals on Google Maps
 NYCSubway.org – Newark City Subway
 Abandoned Stations – Newark City Subway platforms
 Newark, New Jersey: The City Subway (Jon Bell website)

Newark Light Rail
New Jersey streetcar lines
Underground rapid transit in the United States
Rapid transit in New Jersey
Light rail in New Jersey
Transportation in Newark, New Jersey
Transportation in Essex County, New Jersey
Railway lines opened in 1935
NJ Transit Rail Operations
Standard gauge railways in the United States
750 V DC railway electrification
1935 establishments in New Jersey
Public art in Newark, New Jersey